Shira Naor (born ) is an American-born Israeli actress.

She graduated from Tel Aviv Art High School.

She is best known for her Hebrew dubbing as Dora Marquez from "Dora the Explorer".

Filmography

Television 
 Taagad (Hebrew: תאג׳׳ד) (Lia Karni)
 Greenhouse Academy (Season 2) (Young Ryan)
 The Jews are Coming

Dubbing

Animation and Live-Action TV
 Adventure Time (Fionna, Flame Princess)
 American Dragon: Jake Long (Haley Kay Long)
 Ben 10 (Gwen Tennyson (eps 40 Onwards))
 Ben 10: Alien Force (Gwen Tennyson)
 Ben 10: Ultimate Alien (Gwen Tennyson)
 Ben 10: Omniverse (Gwen Tennyson, Additional Characters)
 Bolts and Blip (Lenoia)
 Brandy & Mr. Whiskers (Brandy)
 Care Bears: Adventures in Care-a-lot (Bedtime Bear)
 Cosmic Quantum Ray (Atee)
 Dora the Explorer (Dora Márquez)
 Go, Diego, Go! (Dora Márquez)
 Dora and Friends: Into the City! (Dora Márquez)
 Dragon Ball Z (Pan)
 Dragon Ball GT (Pan)
 Edgar & Ellen (Additional Characters (Season 2))
 Grossology (Abby Archer/Abby Archer Skeleton)
 Jakers! The Adventures of Piggley Winks (Piggley Winks (Child))
 Little Clowns of Happytown (Additional Characters)
 Matt's Monsters (Additional Characters)
 MegaMan NT Warrior (Yai Ayanokoji)
 Mix Master (Pachi)
 Monster Allergy (Elena Potato)
 Once Upon a Time... The Discoverers (Psi)
 Paw Patrol (Rocky)
 Pet Alien (Melba Manners (Season 2))
 Ruby Gloom (Iris)
 Rugrats Pre-School Daze (Savannah)
 Sailor Moon (Ami Mizuno/Sailor Mercury (ep. 151 onwards))
 Strawberry Shortcake (Ginger Snap)
 Strawberry Shortcake's Berry Bitty Adventures (Ginger Snap)
 Sidekick (Vana Glama/Vana Glama of the Costumes)
 Tai Chi Chasers (Sena)
 The Save-Ums! (Jazzi)
 Total Drama: Revenge of the Island (Dakota/Dakotazoid)
 Total Drama: All-Stars (Lindsay)
 Total Drama: Pahkitew Island (Sky)
 Total Drama Presents: The Ridonculous Race (Kitty, Emma)
 Turbo F.A.S.T. (Burn)
 YooHoo & Friends (Pookee's Daughter)
 Young Justice (Artemis Crock)
 YuYu Hakusho (Keiko Yukimura)
 ChalkZone (Rudy Tabootie)
 Kitty Is Not a Cat (Kitty)

Animated and Live Action Films/Direct-To-Video Films
 Arthur Christmas (Bryony)
 Ben 10: Secret of the Omnitrix (Gwen Tennyson)
 Ben 10: Destroy All Aliens (Gwen Tennyson)
 Care Bears Film Series
 The Care Bears' Big Wish Movie (Good Luck Bear, Bedtime Bear)
 Care Bears: Share Bear Shines (Bedtime Bear)
 Care Bears: The Giving Festival (Bedtime Bear)
 Cars 3 (Cruz Ramirez)
 Charlotte's Web (Nellie)
 Chicken Little (Additional Voices)
 Coraline (Additional Voices)
 Dora and the Lost City of Gold (Dora Marquez) (Trailer Only)
 Epic (Mary Katherine)
 Harry Potter and the Order of the Phoenix (Luna Lovegood (Evanna Lynch))
 Harry Potter and the Half-Blood Prince (Luna Lovegood (Evanna Lynch))
 Horrid Henry: The Movie (Moody Margaret (Scarlett Stitt))
 Horton Hears a Who! (Jessica Quilligan, Hillary)
 Ice Age: The Meltdown (Additional Voices)
 Ice Age: Dawn of the Dinosaurs (Dinosaur Baby)
 Ice Age: Continental Drift (Katie)
 Madagascar (Additional Voices)
 Monster House (Jennifer "Jenny" Bennett)
 Nanny McPhee and the Big Bang (Megsie Green (Lil Woods))
 Nim's Island (Nim Rusoe (Abigail Breslin))
 Over the Hedge (Mackenzie)
 Secret of the Wings (Periwinkle)
 Strawberry Shortcake: The Sweet Dreams Movie (Ginger Snap)
 The Simpsons Movie (Lisa Simpson, Maggie Simpson)
 The Spiderwick Chronicles (Young Lucinda Spiderwick (Jordy Benattar))
 Turbo (Burn)

References

External links
 
 

1993 births
Living people
Actresses from Los Angeles
Israeli Ashkenazi Jews
Israeli television actresses
Israeli voice actresses
21st-century Israeli actresses
21st-century American women